John Henry "Ace" Cannon (May 5, 1934 – December 6, 2018) was an American tenor and alto saxophonist.  He played and toured with Hi Records stablemate Bill Black's Combo, and started a solo career with his record "Tuff" in 1961, using the Black combo as his backing group. "Tuff" hit #17 on the U.S. Billboard Hot 100 in 1962, and the follow-up single "Blues (Stay Away from Me)" hit #36 that same year. In April 1965, he released Ace Cannon Live (HL 12025); according to the liner notes by Nick Pesce the album was recorded in front of a live audience inside Hi's recording studio, and Pesce claims this was the first time such an album had ever been recorded (as opposed to previous live albums recorded in concert venues).

Cannon was inducted into the Rockabilly Hall of Fame in 2000. In May 2007, his hometown of Calhoun City, Mississippi, hosted its first annual Ace Cannon Festival, and on December 9, 2008, he was honored with induction into the Mississippi Musicians' Hall of Fame.

After years of traveling and entertaining fans the world over, he moved back to Calhoun City in the late 1980s, where he resided until his death. He played numerous dates each year, and would be found most days working on his golf game at his home course.

He died at his home on December 6, 2018, at the age of 84.

Selected Discography

Albums 
 1962 - Tuff Sax (US Hot Albums #24)
 1964 - Plays the Great Show Tunes
 1964 - Aces Hi  
 1964 - The Moanin' Sax of Ace Cannon 
 1964 - Christmas Cheers from Ace Cannon (US Hot Albums #44)
 1965 - Live
 1966 - Sweet & Tuff
 1967 - Incomparable Sax of Ace Cannon
 1967 - Memphis Golden Hits
 1967 - The Misty Sax of Ace Cannon
 1969 - Ace of Sax
 1972 - Cannon Country - Ace, That is!
 1972 - Country Comfort
 1973 - Baby Don't Get Hooked On Me
 1974 - That Music City Feeling

Singles 

 A Peaked at #3 on US R&B charts
 B Peaked at #73 on US Country Singles

References

External links

 Discography
Ace Cannon Interview NAMM Oral History Library (2012)

1934 births
2018 deaths
People from Grenada, Mississippi
American male saxophonists
Hi Records artists
People from Calhoun City, Mississippi
Musicians from Mississippi
21st-century American saxophonists
21st-century American male musicians
20th-century American saxophonists